The Advanced Soaring Concepts Falcon, also called the Advanced Soaring Concepts American Falcon, is an American mid-wing, T-tailed, single-seat, FAI 15-Metre Class glider that was designed by Tor Jensen and produced by Advanced Soaring Concepts, and first flew in 1993. The aircraft was produced as a kit for amateur construction.

Design and development
The Falcon was designed by Jensen as the 15-metre class version of the FAI Standard Class Spirit.

The aircraft is made predominantly from fiberglass sandwiches, with the wing spar made from carbon-fiber-reinforced polymer. The cockpit is made from welded steel tube, reinforced with Aramid. Glidepath control is via full span trailing edge flaps, coupled with top surface Schempp-Hirth-style airbrakes. The flaps can be set to +15°, +10°, +5°, 0°, and -5° in flight. The landing gear is a retractable monowheel.

Specifications (Falcon)

See also

References

1990s United States sailplanes
Homebuilt aircraft
Aircraft first flown in 1993
T-tail aircraft